is a private junior college in Utsunomiya, Tochigi, Japan, established in 1989. It is attached to the Bunsei University of Art.

External links
 Official website 

Japanese junior colleges
Educational institutions established in 1989
Private universities and colleges in Japan
Universities and colleges in Tochigi Prefecture
1989 establishments in Japan